The 1968 All-Ireland Senior Camogie Championship was the high point of the 1968 season in Camogie. The championship was won by Wexford who defeated Cork by a three-point margin in the final.

Dublin’s Defeat
Dublin’s 2–3 to 1–3 defeat by Kilkenny at Parnell Park on 23 June 1968 was their first defeat in a Leinster championship match since July 1936, when they lost to Louth. Agnes Hourigan wrote in the Irish Press
Kilkenny earned the unexpected victory and the right to meet Wexford in the Leinster final because they were the more alert side all through, faster to the ball and always showed the greater dash. Dublin played with the wind in the opening half, and though they had more of the play, it was Kilkenny who made the better use of fewer chances to lead by 2–0 to 0–1 at the interval, with goals from Breda Kinsella and Teasie O'Neill to Maureen Brennan’s Dublin point. The winners increased their lead soon after the restart, when Ann Carroll pointed from a 30, but Dublin now rallied. Judy Doyle took a neat pass from Anne McAllister to score a good goal. Kilkenny again attacked and after failing on two 30s had a vital point by Breda Kinsella. Dublin switched Kitty Murphy to right wing and Maureen Brennan to midfield and staged a late rally that brought points from Kitty Murphy and Kit Kehoe to reduce the margin to two points. Kilkenny had the last word, however, when Ann Carroll landed a long range point to clinch victory. It was Dublin’s first defeat in this competition since they lost to Louth in July 1936.
Kilkenny played two matches to reach the Leinster final while Wexford got there without playing a match, getting a bye in the first round and then got a walkover from Louth. As Agnes Hourigan pointed out in the Irish Press
Beginning with a coaching course around Easter, the drive went on for the revival of defunct clubs, and was continued by naming a panel of county players early on and giving them as much match-play experience as possible against varied opposition. That long-term preparation certainly paid off on Sunday when the whole Kilkenny side, from start to stop, played with the most important asset of all. They went out in the firm belief that they could beat Dublin and they did just that.

Leinster final
It took Kilkenny six years to win an All Ireland title, instead it was Wexford who delivered a breakthrough victory in 1968. They killed off the Linester final with three goals in the first ten minutes and went on to defeat Kilkenny 8–3 to 1–3 with four goals from Mary Doyle, and one each from Josie Kehoe, Bridget O'Connor, Mary Walsh and Eileen Allen.

Final
Two goals down after seven minutes, Wexford battled back in the second quarter to win the final. One of their heroines was playing in her first senior game, Josie Kehoe from Cloughbawn, a last minute change at corner forward for Eileen Allen, and scored an opportunist first goal after the Cork goalkeeper had saved a free from Breda Doyle that was going over for a point. Agnes Hourigan wrote in the Irish Press
Always fast and never without excitement this was a most satisfying game that kept the crowd of between five and six thousand in a constant uproar as Cork against the odds, swept into an early lead. But Wexford came storming back to first level and then draw ahead, so that the Leinster champions seemed well on the road to victory when they led 3–1 to 2–0 at half time, with the advantage of the fresh breeze still to come.

Final stages

 
MATCH RULES
50 minutes
Replay if scores level
Maximum of 3 substitutions

See also
 All-Ireland Senior Hurling Championship
 Wikipedia List of Camogie players
 National Camogie League
 Camogie All Stars Awards
 Ashbourne Cup

References

External links
 Camogie Association
 Historical reports of All Ireland finals
 All-Ireland Senior Camogie Championship: Roll of Honour
 Camogie on facebook
 Camogie on GAA Oral History Project

All-Ireland Senior Camogie Championship
1968
All-Ireland Senior Camogie Championship